The New Elite is the tenth studio album by American-Czech death metal band Master. It was released on July 5, 2012, through Pulverised Records.

Track listing

Personnel
Master
 Paul Speckmann – bass, vocals
 Aleš "Alex 93" Nejezchleba – guitars
 Zdeněk "Zdenál" Pradlovský – drums

Guest
 Martin Mikulec – solo guitar on "Guide Yourself"

Production
 Mark Bridgeman – CD artwork
 Petr Nejezchleba – engineering, mastering, mixing
 Raúl González – vinyl artwork

References

2012 albums
Master (American band) albums